Nung language may refer to:
 Nung language (Sino-Tibetan), a Sino-Tibetan language of China and Myanmar
 Nung language (Tai), a Kra-Dai language of Vietnam, China and Laos